The Very Best of Elkie Brooks may refer to any of several to Elkie Brooks compilation albums:

 The Very Best of Elkie Brooks (A&M), issued in 1986 on CD, vinyl and cassette through A&M Records in the Granada TV region only
 The Very Best of Elkie Brooks (1997 album), released on CD and cassette by PolyGram TV
 The Very Best of Elkie Brooks (1986 album), issued on CD, vinyl and cassette in 1986 through Telstar Records